Jenneria is a genus of sea snails, marine gastropod mollusks in the family Ovulidae, one of the families of cowry allies.

Species
Species within the genus Jenneria includde:
 † Jenneria nodulosa Dolin & Lozouet, 2004
Jenneria pustulata (Lightfoot, 1786)

References

 Dolin, L. & Lozouet, P., 2004. Nouvelles espèces de Gastéropodes (Mollusca: Gastropoda) de l'Oligocène et du Miocène inférieur de l'Aquitaine (Sud-Ouest de la France). Partie 3. Cypraeidae et Ovulidae. Cossmanniana: 164 pp, sér. hors série n°4
 Lorenz F. & Fehse D. (2009) The living Ovulidae. A manual of the families of allied cowries: Ovulidae, Pediculariidae and Eocypraeidae. Hackenheim: Conchbooks

External links

Pediculariinae